United Nations Security Council Resolution 248, adopted on March 24, 1968, after receiving letters from Jordan and Israel as well as supplementary information from the Chief of Staff of the United Nations Truce Supervision Organization, the Council reaffirmed its previous resolutions and condemned the Battle of Karameh military action launched by Israel in flagrant violation of the UN Charter.  The Council deplored all violent incidents in violation of the cease-fire and called upon Israel to desist from acts and activities in contravention of resolution 237.

See also
Battle of Karameh
Arab–Israeli conflict
List of United Nations Security Council Resolutions 201 to 300 (1965–1971)

References
Text of the Resolution at undocs.org

 0248
 0248
1968 in Israel
 0248
March 1968 events